Parsaloi is a rural region in Kenya.

References

Places
Geography of Kenya